Li Shujin (born August 1, 1982) is a male wrestler from China.  He competed at the 2012 Summer Olympics, finishing in 7th place.

See also
 China at the 2012 Summer Olympics

References

External links
 

Living people
1982 births
Chinese male sport wrestlers
Wrestlers at the 2012 Summer Olympics
Olympic wrestlers of China
Asian Games medalists in wrestling
Sportspeople from Jiangxi
Wrestlers at the 2010 Asian Games
World Wrestling Championships medalists
Asian Games bronze medalists for China
Medalists at the 2010 Asian Games
21st-century Chinese people
20th-century Chinese people